Glottal consonants are consonants using the glottis as their primary articulation. Many phoneticians consider them, or at least the glottal fricative, to be transitional states of the glottis without a point of articulation as other consonants have, while some do not consider them to be consonants at all. However, glottal consonants behave as typical consonants in many languages.

The glottal consonants in the International Phonetic Alphabet are as follows:

Characteristics
In many languages, the "fricatives" are not true fricatives. This is a historical usage of the word. Lamé is one of very few languages that contrasts voiceless and voiced glottal fricatives.

The glottal stop occurs in many languages. Often all vocalic onsets are preceded by a glottal stop, for example in German (in careful pronunciation; often omitted in practice). The Hawaiian language writes the glottal stop as the ‘okina ‘, which resembles a single open quotation mark. Some alphabets use diacritics for the glottal stop, such as hamza  in the Arabic alphabet; in many languages of Mesoamerica, the Latin letter  is used for glottal stop, in Maltese, the letter  is used, and in many indigenous languages of the Caucasus, the letter commonly referred to as heng  is used.

Because the glottis is necessarily closed for the glottal stop, it cannot be voiced. So-called voiced glottal stops are not full stops, but rather creaky voiced glottal approximants that may be transcribed . They occur as the intervocalic allophone of glottal stop in many languages.

See also
 Glottalic consonant
 Glottalization
 Place of articulation
 Index of phonetics articles
 Guttural

References

 

Place of articulation